Baeckea leptocaulis is a species of flowering plant in the family Myrtaceae and is endemic to Tasmania. It is a shrub with linear leaves and small white flowers with five or six stamens.

Description 

Taxonomy
Baeckea leptocaulis was first formally described in 1840 by Joseph Dalton Hooker in William Jackson Hooker's Icones Plantarum from specimens collected by Ronald Gunn at Rocky Cape. The specific epithet (leptocaulis) means "thin-stemmed".

Distribution and habitat
This baeckea grows in wet heathland and sedgeland in western and central Tasmania.

References

leptocaulis
Flora of Tasmania
Plants described in 1840
Taxa named by Joseph Dalton Hooker